In probability theory and statistics, the generalized chi-squared distribution (or generalized chi-square distribution) is the distribution of a quadratic form of a  multinormal variable (normal vector), or a linear combination of different normal variables and squares of normal variables. Equivalently, it is also a linear sum of independent noncentral chi-square variables and a normal variable. There are several other such generalizations for which the same term is sometimes used; some of them are special cases of the family discussed here, for example the gamma distribution.

Definition
The generalized chi-squared variable may be described in multiple ways. One is to write it as a linear sum of independent noncentral chi-square variables and a normal variable:

Some important special cases of this have all weights  of the same sign, or have central chi-squared components, or omit the normal term.

Since a non-central chi-squared variable is a sum of squares of normal variables with different means, the generalized chi-square variable is also defined as a sum of squares of independent normal variables, plus an independent normal variable: that is, a quadratic in normal variables.

Another equivalent way is to formulate it as a quadratic form of a normal vector : 

.

These, together with the mean  and covariance matrix  of the normal vector , parameterize the distribution. The parameters of the former expression (in terms of non-central chi-squares, a normal and a constant) can be calculated in terms of the parameters of the latter expression (quadratic form of a normal vector).

For the most general case, a reduction towards a common standard form can be made by using a representation of the following form:

where D is a diagonal matrix and where x represents a vector of uncorrelated standard normal random variables.

Computing the pdf/cdf/inverse cdf/random numbers

The probability density, cumulative distribution, and inverse cumulative distribution functions of a generalized chi-squared variable do not have simple closed-form expressions. However, numerical algorithms and computer code (Fortran and C, Matlab, R, Python) have been published to evaluate some of these, and to generate random samples.

Applications

The generalized chi-squared is the distribution of statistical estimates in cases where the usual statistical theory does not hold, as in the examples below.

In model fitting and selection
If a predictive model is fitted by least squares, but the residuals have either autocorrelation or heteroscedasticity, then alternative models can be compared (in model selection) by relating changes in the sum of squares to an asymptotically valid generalized chi-squared distribution.

Classifying normal vectors using Gaussian discriminant analysis
The log likelihood ratio that  arises from one normal distribution versus another is also a quadratic form, so distributed as a generalized chi-squared.

In Gaussian discriminant analysis, samples from multinormal distributions are optimally separated by using a quadratic classifier, a boundary that is a quadratic function (e.g. the curve defined by setting the likelihood ratio between two Gaussians to 1). The classification error rates of different types (false positives and false negatives) are integrals of the normal distributions within the quadratic regions defined by this classifier. Since this is mathematically equivalent to integrating a quadratic form of a normal vector, the result is an integral of a generalized-chi-squared variable.

In signal processing
The following application arises in the context of Fourier analysis in signal processing, renewal theory in probability theory, and multi-antenna systems in wireless communication. The common factor of these areas is that the sum of exponentially distributed variables is of importance (or identically, the sum of squared magnitudes of circularly-symmetric centered complex Gaussian variables).

If  are k independent, circularly-symmetric centered complex Gaussian random variables with mean 0 and variance , then the random variable

has a generalized chi-squared distribution of a particular form. The difference from the standard chi-squared distribution is that  are complex and can have different variances, and the difference from the more general generalized chi-squared distribution is that the relevant scaling matrix A is diagonal. If  have distinct values for all i, then  has the pdf

If there are sets of repeated variances among , assume that they are divided into M sets, each representing a certain variance value.  Denote  to be the number of repetitions in each group. That is, the mth set contains  variables that have variance   It represents an arbitrary linear combination of independent -distributed random variables with different degrees of freedom:

where

See also
 Degrees of freedom (statistics)#Alternative
 Noncentral chi-squared distribution
 Chi-squared distribution

References

External links
 Davies, R.B.: Fortran and C source code for "Linear combination of chi-squared random variables"
 Das, A: MATLAB code to compute the statistics, pdf, cdf, inverse cdf and random numbers of the generalized chi-square distribution.

Continuous distributions